The Chief of the Defence Staff (CDS) is the professional head of the Nigerian Armed Forces and the most senior uniformed military adviser to the minister of defence and the president of Nigeria. The chief of the defence staff is based at the Defence Headquarters, Abuja and works alongside the Permanent Secretary of Defence. The Chief of Defence is the highest ranking officer to currently serve in the armed forces.

It is occupied by the most senior commissioned officer appointed by the President of Nigeria. The position was established for the first time under Nigeria's 1979 constitution.

The current chief of the defence staff is General Lucky Irabor, who succeeded General Abayomi Olonisakin in January 2021.

Role
The Chief of Defence Staff gives operational directives to the Nigerian Armed Forces through the service chiefs and reports to the commander-in-Chief with administrative supervision of the Honourable Minister of Defence.  It is the duty and responsibility of the CDS to formulate and execute policies, programmes towards the highest attainment of National Security and operational competence of the Armed Forces namely;  the Army, Navy and Air Force. 

The CDS is assisted by the other Service Chiefs:
 Chief of Army Staff
 Chief of Naval Staff
 Chief of the Air Staff

List of Chief of the Defence Staff
The chiefs have been:

References

External links 
 Chief Defence staff Nigeria

Nigerian military appointments
Nigeria